Christopher Rafter (24 February 1935 – 14 February 2010) was an Irish boxer. He competed in the men's bantamweight event at the 1964 Summer Olympics. At the 1964 Summer Olympics, he lost to Abel Almarez of Argentina.

References

External links
 

1935 births
2010 deaths
Irish male boxers
Olympic boxers of Ireland
Boxers at the 1964 Summer Olympics
Place of birth missing
Bantamweight boxers